The MV Ioannis MK was a bulk carrier built by the Marugame shipyard in Japan as the Masashima Maru in 1977 which sank on 23 July 2009  off Saldanha Bay, South Africa. The ship was carrying 22,500 tonnes of sugar on passage from Brazil to India. All of the crew were rescued by helicopter.

References

1977 ships
Shipwrecks in the Atlantic Ocean
Maritime incidents in 2009